Ellington Showcase is an album by American pianist, composer and bandleader Duke Ellington recorded for the Capitol label at various sessions in 1953–55. The album has not been released on CD but the tracks have appeared on The Complete Capitol Recordings of Duke Ellington released by Mosaic Records in 1995.

Reception
The Allmusic review awarded the album 3 stars.

Track listing
:All compositions by Duke Ellington except as indicated
 "Blossom" (Ellington, Billy Strayhorn) - 2:29
 "Big Drag" - 2:51
 "Don't Ever Say Goodbye" - 3:01
 "Falling Like a Raindrop" - 3:02
 "Gonna Tan Your Hide" (Ellington, Strayhorn) - 6:13
 "Harlem Air Shaft" - 3:54
 "La Virgen De La Macarena" (Bernardo Bautista Monterde) - 4:02
 "Clarinet Melodrama" (Jimmy Hamilton) - 5:42
 "Theme For Trambean" (Hamilton) - 3:26
 "Serious Serenade" - 2:50
Recorded at Capitol Studios in Los Angeles on April 9, 1953 (track 1), at Universal Studios in Chicago on July 1, 1953 (track 2) December 29, 1953 (track 3), January 17, 1954 (track 4), May 17, 1955 (tracks 6 & 7), and May 18, 1955 (tracks 8-10), and at Capitol Studios in New York on June 17, 1954 (track 5).

Personnel
Duke Ellington – piano, electric piano (tracks 1, 2 & 5-10)
Billy Strayhorn - piano (tracks 3 & 4)
Cat Anderson, Willie Cook, Ray Nance, Clark Terry - trumpet
Quentin Jackson, George Jean (tracks 2 & 4), Juan Tizol (track 1 & 2), Britt Woodman - trombone
John Sanders - valve trombone (tracks 5-10)
Russell Procope - alto saxophone, clarinet
Rick Henderson - alto saxophone 
Paul Gonsalves - tenor saxophone
Jimmy Hamilton - clarinet, tenor saxophone
Harry Carney - baritone saxophone, bass clarinet
Wendell Marshall (tracks 1-5), Jimmy Woode (tracks 6-10) - bass 
Butch Ballard (tracks 1 & 2) Dave Black (tracks 3-10)  - drums

References

Capitol Records albums
Duke Ellington albums
1955 albums